Jeffrey Elmore (born January 17, 1978) is an American politician and educator who is a member of the North Carolina House of Representatives. He has represented the 94th district (including constituents in Alexander and Wilkes counties) since 2013.

Background
Representative Jeffrey Elmore, jeffreyelmore.com, serves the 94th House District in the North Carolina House of Representatives. The 94th District is made up of the population centers of Wilkes County and Alexander County.. He has held this position since his election in 2012. He is Chairman of Appropriations, as well as a member of several committees.    Prior to his service in state government, he served as a Commissioner in the Town of North Wilkesboro and was elected in 2007. Prior to his service as Commissioner, he served as a planning board member and chairman of the Board of Adjustments. He served as president of Professional Educators of North Carolina (PENC), a nonpartisan group of 7,000 teachers in North Carolina and also as a board member of the Blue Ridge Opportunity Commission (BROC) which manages Head Start and aids unprivileged citizens. BROC serves Wilkes, Ashe, and Alleghany counties. Jeffrey grew up in Wilkes County and has deep family roots. Jeffrey was a North Carolina Teaching Fellow and graduated from Appalachian State University, Summa Cum Laude. Upon graduation he went into the classroom. Jeffrey is a teacher in Wilkes County Schools and is in his twentieth year. Elmore was elected to the North Carolina House of Representatives in 2012 and assumed office in 2013.

Committee assignments

2021-2022 session
Appropriations (Chair)
Appropriations - Education(Vice Chair)
Agriculture
Education - K-12
Education - Community Colleges
Pensions and Retirement

2019-2020 session
Appropriations (Vice Chair)
Appropriations - Education (Chair)
Education - K-12 (Chair)
Agriculture
Education - Community Colleges
Pensions and Retirement
Redistricting

2017-2018 session
Appropriations (Vice Chair)
Appropriations - Education (Chair)
Education - K-12 (Chair)
Education - Universities
Pensions and Retirement
Energy and Public Utilities
State Personnel

2015-2016 session
Appropriations
Appropriations - Education
Education - K-12 (Chair)
Education - Universities
Pensions and Retirement
Public Utilities
State Personnel

2013-2014 session
Appropriations
Education (Vice Chair)
Public Utilities
State Personnel
Government

Electoral history

2020

2018

2016

2014

2012

References

1978 births
Living people
People from Wilkesboro, North Carolina
People from North Wilkesboro, North Carolina
Appalachian State University alumni
21st-century American politicians
Republican Party members of the North Carolina House of Representatives